Abbey House on Abbey Road, Barrow-in-Furness, Cumbria, England is a Neo-Elizabethan H-plan mansion designed by Sir Edwin Lutyens and completed in 1914 as a guest house for Vickers Ltd and a flat for the Managing Director, Sir James McKechnie.  In its abstracted, military echo of the Tudor style, it prefigures the style of Lutyens' Castle Drogo. In 1951, having been acquired by the County Council, Abbey House was made into an old people's home, and consequently suffered considerable neglect. Abbey House has been a Grade II* Listed Building since 1949.

In 1984, it was sold by the Council and restored as a hotel. The Abbey House Hotel is a four-star venue set in 14 acres of gardens and saw a major extension during the early 2000s.

References

C. Aslet, The last country houses, 1982, pp. 34, 310
Country Life, 1921, vol. xlix, p. 398
G. Stamp, Edwin Lutyens' country houses, 2001, pp. 32, 150-155

External links
 Abbey House Hotel

Hotels in Cumbria
Buildings and structures in Barrow-in-Furness
Works of Edwin Lutyens in England
Grade II* listed buildings in Cumbria
Country houses in Cumbria
Country house hotels